Starker is a surname shared by:

  (1872–1938), German painter
 János Starker (1924–2013), Jewish Hungarian-American cellist
 Joseph B. Starker (1929–1975), US Army brigadier general, helicopter pilot

See also 
 A. Starker Leopold (1913–1983), American author, forester, zoologist and conservationist
 Starker exchange

German-language surnames
Jewish surnames